The Voyah i-Land is a concept electric grand tourer designed by Italdesign and presented in 2020 for the new Chinese brand Voyah, a subsidiary of Dongfeng Motor Corporation.

Presentation
The Voyah i-Land concept was presented at 2020 Auto China. The i-Land foreshadows the first model of the electric brand Voyah scheduled for 2021.

Technical characteristics
The Voyah i-Land is based on the technical platform ESSA (Electric, Smart Secure Architecture) from the manufacturer Dongfeng. It has 2 butterfly doors, and 3 seats, a passenger seat and two rear seats.

References

Dongfeng vehicles
Concept cars
Electric sports cars
Automobiles with gull-wing doors
Grand tourers
Cars introduced in 2020